Thabang Sampson Makwetla MP (born 18 May 1957) is a South African politician affiliated with the African National Congress (ANC). He is a Member of the National Assembly of South Africa and is the current Deputy Minister of Defence and Military Veterans, a role he previously served in between 2009 and 2014. He has also served as the Deputy Minister of Justice and Correctional Services, and was Premier of Mpumalanga province between 2004 and 2009.

Early life and exile
Thabang Sampson Phathakge Makwetla was born on 18 May 1957 in Lydenburg, a mining town in the Eastern Transvaal province, now known as Mpumalanga, South Africa. Since he participated in the  Soweto Student Uprising in June 1976, he was forced to flee the country before he could matriculate. He fled to Lesotho to complete his schooling and joined the ANC's military wing Umkhonto we Sizwe (MK), later serving as an instructor and political commissar in the organization. While serving in the MK, Makwetla was stationed in neighboring countries, such as Angola, Botswana, and Zambia.

Matwetla received education in Europe, earning a diploma from the Academy of Sciences in Bulgaria, and also undertook a short military training course from the Soviet Union in 1979. Makwetla returned to Africa and worked as treasurer for the South African Communist Party in the Botswanan region from 1981 to 1990.

It was near the end of apartheid when Makwetla returned to South Africa, joining the National Executive Committee of the ANC's youth wing, the African National Congress Youth League.

Political career
Makwetla is a member of the African National Congress, a centre-left democratic-socialist party, and is working under the cabinet of South African President Matamela Cyril Ramaphosa, who took office after Jacob Zuma's resignation on 14 February 2018.

Position
Makwetla is a leftist, a political stance substantiated by his history as a member of the South African Communist Party and the African National Congress.

Speeches
Makwetla, during his time as an ANC chairman, was asked about how to cease the spreading of HIV and AIDS throughout South Africa. "As the ANC, we need to lead in this regard to change attitudes associated with being infected with the AIDS virus," and, "We should start seeing AIDS for what it is, a biological disaster visited upon humanity, and stop blaming individuals."

Makwetla delivered a noted progress report to ANC Representatives on 9 March 2012 in Johannesburg, during his term as Minister of Defence and Military Veterans. He stated in the report that soldiers could, "receive counselling as their lives had been disrupted at the time of the struggle for the democracy," as well as educate veterans, wanting to, "provide entrepreneurial training for those interested in taking up business careers."

During his term as Minister of Justice and Correctional Services, Makwetla visited St. Alban's Prison in Port Elizabeth, South Africa, where a clash between inmates and officers resulted in three deaths. During the 27 December 2016 visit, he stated, “In order to strengthen our enforcement capabilities, we have decided to place St. Albans on a lockdown and suspend all family visits to the centre. This is a necessary precautionary step in order to bring back normalcy to the centre” and, “the Ministry wish to commend officials who managed to quell down this rebellious act that could have led to a calamitous situation on our hands. In the same vein, our condolences and sympathy goes to the families and relatives of the deceased inmates[.]"

It was reported a fight had broken out between factions of the MKMVA in late 2017, "One group, made up of some MKMVA members and the MK National Council led by Deputy Minister of Justice and Correctional Services Thabang Makwetla and former MK chief of staff Siphiwe Nyanda, has threatened to go to court if the ANC fails to nullify the results of an MKMVA elective conference in June at which Kebby Maphatsoe was re-elected president."

Makwetla has denounced the rampant corruption and immorality of South African governments while in office. In a media briefing, he stated that, “there is a need for lifestyle audits and vetting of ANC leadership at all levels of the organisation, stamping out corruption and state capture", and separately, "You cannot have any group of people who purport to have the capacity to protect lives in South Africa who are not mandated to do so. We have police, military establishment to deal with unlawful acts."

Humanitarian work
On 30 March 2017, Makwetla officially opened a new pharmacy at the Mthatha Correctional Centre to provide medication to the 4000 inmates in correctional centres in Mthatha and its surrounding areas, such as Tabankulu and Mount Fletcher.

On 26 September 2017, Makwetla built a new home for a Soweto family in Moletsane, after their original home burned in an electrical fire. He was joined by parolees from seven different police facilities in the area. On 6 December 2017, Makwetla helped organise the construction of a different home for 93-year-old Harriet Mfolozi, and her unemployed 30-year-old grandson in the Eastern Cape town of Lusikisiki. They were previously living in a mud house.

Controversies
In the late 2000s, Makwetla was reported to have pledged his support for former South African President, Thabo Mbeki, who announced his resignation amidst corruption charges on 20 September 2008. As a consequence of this support, Makwetla lost his position of provincial chairperson of Mpumalanga to his deputy David Mabuza who supported Jacob Zuma's successful bid to be ANC President at the 2007 Polokwane national congress, but later Makwetla was able to assume the role of deputy of the Minister of Defence and Military Veterans.

During a conference with former MK soldiers in Johannesburg, he accused MK Military Veterans’ Association (MKMVA) chairperson Kebby Maphatsoe of seeking to "derail his vision" by interfering in the politics of the ANC. He began to lash out during the meeting, specifically at the MKMVA for performing “an intention on the part of [their] leadership to convene a unilateral conference aimed deliberately at sidelining the overwhelming majority of former members of MK.", which intensified a divide between the two groups.

During the #SONA2018 (State of the Nation Address 2018) controversy, Chief Whip of the Opposition and Member of the South African National Assembly John Steenhuisen stated during a debate speech to members of parliament, which Makwetla was attending, "To the Deputy Minister of Justice and Correctional Services, Thabang Makwetla, I actually don’t know what you’re doing here. You need to be out building more prisons, we’re going to need a hell of a lot more of them soon with these Zuptas. There’s already overcrowding, there’ll be lots more when these people start to fall," alluding to the corruption of former South African president Jacob Zuma. Steenhuisen also spent much of the tirade "humiliating" the ANC and its more recognized members.
He has vehemently denied that he benefited unduly from Bosasa.

Personal life

In late March 2016, articles were released by the Dutch news outlet The Edge Search, as well as the South African paper Independent Online (IOL), which both claimed that Makwetla had been "fobbing off the government" to pay for his alcohol addiction. The articles received little attention, and in the long run have not significantly affected Makwetla's position.

Kidnapping
On the evening of 21 May 2017, Makwetla was driving by himself to Life Riverfield Hospital (a psychiatric care and addiction treatment facility west of Johannesburg), with the intent of visiting Mongane Wally Serote, a renowned South African poet and African National Congress (ANC) supporter. When he arrived at the clinic's gates at approximately 19:30, four masked men in the vehicle behind him shuffled out and approached two of the hospital guards, threatening them. Makwetla while being nearby in his car, saw the altercation and believed the hospital was about to be robbed, until the men switched their attention to him. He said while reliving the incident, “I only realised when a gun was pointed at my head that the robbery was directed at me.” The burglars held him at gunpoint and forced themselves into his Range Rover, taking with them the two guards who were at the gate beforehand.

Makwetla was obligated to lie and keep his head down in the backseat while he was driven to a nearby settlement. When the abductors took him out and repositioned him in their own vehicle, they left either one or some of the thieves to steal his Range Rover. The kidnappers then demanded his ATM cards and cellphone while parked. After withdrawing all the money from his accounts through an unnamed shopping centre, they stopped again, and agreed to eventually dump Makwetla and the two security guards off at Kgabalatsane, a stretch of veld near Brits and Garankuwa, luckily unharmed. The incident lasted for approximately three hours. Makwetla said that at this time, "[The kidnappers] said we must run, and at that point I thought they would now be shooting at us, executing us. Fortunately... they got into their car and sped off." After four hours of walking past houses knocking on doors for help, the three victims found a taxi parked on the side of the road, and asked for use of the driver's cellphone, which is when the police were initially alerted. They were discovered in the early hours of the next day.

Reaction
Many South African politicians were upset by the situation, with Chief Whip Jackson Mthembu saying, two days after the incident, "[...] we express our deepest solace to comrade Makwetla following this horrible incident," but also saying he was, "comforted by the fact that he returned unharmed. [Makwetla] has confirmed that he is physically unharmed and remains in high spirits. He reported back to work this morning." Makwetla had lost a significant amount of his wealth, and since his spokesperson, Ntime Skhosana, wasn't allowed to disclose how much he had lost, Mthembu took it upon himself to alert the public how serious the situation was, prompting for anyone who may have information about the crime to report any information they may have to the police. Additionally, South African Minister of Police Fikile Mbalula called for a changed system to be implemented regarding bail and prosecution for repeated offenders, calling such people "recycled offenders" in an interview after the incident. After discovering one of the suspects in Makwetla's kidnapping was previously released on bail for a separate hijacking crime, he stated, “these are not new people, they go to the police station, get bail and come back," and that he wished to, “[go] big; a lot of people will be arrested.” An unnamed VIP protector being interviewed at the time claimed that, "this whole thing is strange," alluding to the fact that Makwetla had no bodyguard with him when he went to visit Serote, a rare occurrence for politicians in South Africa, "It’s only when they want to go somewhere private‚ but even then it’s rare not to have at least a bodyguard with them." He later said of the incident, "Maybe it will be a wake-up call to the government so they can see what crime is really like and what the public go through on a daily basis."

Aftermath
After the kidnapping, Makwetla's stolen landrover was sold by one of the kidnappers to a Nigerian collector. Detectives were still attempting to track down the vehicle as of late 2017.

Also, Makwetla has said he and his family were recovering after the incident. “It was a harrowing experience, [but] you mentally regain your sanity with time.” He has also been able to provide his own account and thinking during the experience, “At the time I was a bit confused, because I didn’t interpret it as a car hijacking ... I just assumed it wouldn’t take four people to hijack a car. I expected the worst.”

Prosecution
After a case was opened with the local Garankuwa police station, one of the suspects were quickly identified as Brandon Katlego Mashigo (aged 22), who was found and arrested less than 24 hours later in the Garankuwa area. The others were found (Mojalefa Mathe, Motsepe Gidion, and Ben Kutumela) between 2:00-6:00 in the following areas respectively by time: Atteridgeville, Montana Park (and Chantelle), and Orchards, which are each neighborhoods in or around the Gauteng city of Pretoria. They have all faced charges of kidnapping and robbery with aggravation at Garankuwa Magistrate’s Court. After the arrest, they were initially attributed to a crime syndicate responsible for many more robberies within the area, but there was too little evidence to prove it, thus it was dropped. It was also confirmed Makwetla was standing present at the proceedings, along with an entourage of Umkhonto we Sizwe veterans.

He has stated in an interview that he wished to both speak to and rehabilitate the hijackers; he "had tried to reason with the group and explain that he recognised the hardship under which they lived," and that "he would want them to recognise [they're] proud South Africans."

There is currently no consensus on whether or not the crime was politically charged. Skhosana replied when asked this, saying, "It would be prejudicial to enter into any speculation."

See also

African Commission on Human and Peoples' Rights
Bantustan
Democracy Index
Constitution of South Africa
History of the African National Congress
Mpumalanga Provincial Legislature
Parliament
Politics in South Africa
Provincial governments of South Africa
South African Border War
1994 South African general election

References

Further reading
"Stories of the Liberation Struggles in South Africa: Mpumalanga Province" written by Prof. Thabo Israel Pudi, 2014
"Anatomy of South Africa: Who Holds the Power?" written by Richard Calland, 2006
"Electoral Politics in South Africa: Assessing the First Democratic Decade", edited by J. Piombo, L. Nijzink, 2005
"The Mail & Guardian A-Z of South African Politics", edited by Barbara Ludman and Paul Stober, 2004

External links
Mpumalanga Provincial Government's Official Website
Western Cape Government's Official Website

1957 births
20th-century South African politicians
21st-century South African politicians
Living people
People from Lydenburg
Members of the South African Communist Party
African National Congress politicians
Members of the National Assembly of South Africa
Premiers of Mpumalanga
Members of provincial legislatures of South Africa
Anti-apartheid activists
South African anti-corruption activists
Kidnapped politicians
Kidnappings in South Africa
Nonviolence advocates
People deported from South Africa
South African exiles
South African humanitarians
South African revolutionaries
South African Sotho people
UMkhonto we Sizwe personnel
University of the Witwatersrand alumni
Members of the Mpumalanga Provincial Legislature